María Rosa Ondo Nsing (born 10 October 1982), better known as María Rosa, is an Equatorial Guinean women's football manager and a retired footballer who played as a goalkeeper. She has been a member of the Equatorial Guinea women's national team, first as a player and later as a coach. She currently chairs the Women's Football Association in her country.

Early life
María Rosa started playing football for INES Rey Malabo in the FENADUE school league.

Club career
María Rosa has made her senior debut for EWaiso Ipola in 2004. She has also played for Águilas Verdes de Aneja, Inter Continental, Real Dona and Estrellas de Guadalupe.

International career
María Rosa has represented Equatorial Guinea at under–20 and senior levels. She was part of the team at the 2011 FIFA Women's World Cup, but was not used.

Managerial career
After retiring from playing, María Rosa has continued to be linked to women's football in Equatorial Guinea. She has been a goalkeeper coach for Sony de Elá Nguema, Malabo Kings and the Equatorial Guinea women's national team.

On 19 September 2020, María Rosa was elected as President of the Women's Football Association in Equatorial Guinea, becoming the first woman to hold that position.

Personal life
María Rosa has a diploma in Marketing and Commercial Action. She is an official in the Ministry of Commerce and Promotion of SMEs where she holds the responsibility of focal point.

References

External links
 

1982 births
Living people
Place of birth missing (living people)
Equatoguinean women's footballers
Women's association football goalkeepers
Equatorial Guinea women's international footballers
2011 FIFA Women's World Cup players
Equatoguinean football managers
Female association football managers
Women's association football managers